Rose Hill Drive is the first official release by the American rock band Rose Hill Drive. The EP was released on the Megaforce/SCI Fidelity record label in 2006, the same year in which their debut album Rose Hill Drive was released. The release of the album meant that the EP was much less popular and was soon put out of print.

All of the songs from the EP except "Intruder" also featured on the debut album.

Due to demand from Rose Hill Drive fans who were unable to get a hold of the song "Intruder", the British-based magazine Classic Rock featured the track on the free CD titled Classic Rock Presents Bone Rattlin' Blues given away with issue 108.

Track listing 
"Raise Your Hands" (4:59)
"Man on Fire" (2:56)
"Intruder" (5:03)
"Cool Cody" [Live] (6:47)

Band
Nathan Barnes - drums
Daniel Sproul - guitars and backing vocals
Jacob Sproul - Bass guitar and lead vocals

Production
Nick DiDia - Producer, engineer, mixing
Scott Roche - Executive producer
Tom Tapley - Engineer, mixing
Rodney Mills - Mastering
Aaron Lasko - Mixing
Joan Jones - Vocal Arrangement

References 

Rose Hill Drive albums
2006 EPs